Cox's Bazar is a city situated in south-eastern Bangladesh.

Cox's Bazar may also refer to:

Geography
 Cox's Bazar Beach, a beach in the same place
 Cox's Bazar District, a district in Bangladesh
 Cox's Bazar Sadar Upazila

Transport
 Cox's Bazar International Airport, Cox's Bazar
 Cox's Bazar–Teknaf Marine Drive
 Cox's Bazar railway station

Constituency
 Cox's Bazar-1
 Cox's Bazar-2
 Cox's Bazar-3
 Cox's Bazar-4

Educational institutions
 Cox's Bazar Polytechnic Institute
 Cox's Bazar Medical College

Others
 Cox's Bazar Stadium
 Cox's Bazar Development Authority